Adriana Medveďová (born 11 July 1992) is a Slovak handballer who plays for the Slovakia national team.

Achievements
Czech–Slovak Interliga:
Winner: 2013, 2014, 2015, 2016, 2017

References

1992 births
Living people
Sportspeople from Banská Bystrica
Slovak female handball players
Expatriate handball players
Slovak expatriate sportspeople in Romania